The National Football League 2010s All-Decade Team is composed of outstanding performers in the National Football League in the ten years spanning 2010–2019.  Only a player or coach's performance during the decade was used as criteria for voting.

Tom Brady, Adrian Peterson, Joe Thomas, Marshal Yanda, J. J. Watt, Aaron Donald, Von Miller, and Justin Tucker were all unanimous selections. Tom Brady, Julius Peppers, Shane Lechler, Devin Hester and Bill Belichick had been previously named to the Pro Football Hall of Fame's 2000s All-Decade Team.

The team
Note 1: Only teams for which a player played in a game from 2010–2019 are listed.
Note 2: Under "Hall of Fame" if a year is listed, i.e., "e-2025", that is the year player is eligible for the Pro Football Hall of Fame.
Note 3: Players listed as active may include free agents. They will no longer be listed as active if they remain a free agent for an entire season.

Offense

Defense

Special teams

Coach

 -- denotes a unanimous selection

External links
Sports Illustrated 2010s All-Decade Team
USA TODAY NFL All-Decade Team
NFL.com 2010s All-Decade Team
The Athletic NFL all-decade team
PFF 2010s All-Decade Team
Yahoo Sports' NFL all-decade team
Talk Of Fame Network 2010 NFL all-decade team
GridFe 2010s All-Decade Team

References

National Football League All-Decade Teams
Foot
Foot
Foot
National Football League lists
National Football League records and achievements